Gull Lake High School is part of the Gull Lake Community Schools in Richland, Michigan. The district was consolidated in the early 1960s from the existing Richland, Kellogg, and Bedford secondary schools and serves nearly 1000 students from a three-county area:  NE Kalamazoo, NW Calhoun, and Southern Barry Counties.  The school mascot is the Blue Devil.

Demographics
The demographic breakdown of the 962 students enrolled for the 2012-2013 school year was:
Male - 48.8%
Female - 51.2%
Native American/Alaskan - 0.2%
Asian/Pacific islanders - 1.3%
Black - 3.8%
Hispanic - 2.7%
White - 89.1%
Multiracial - 2.9%

In addition, 15.2% of the students were eligible for free or reduced lunch.

Athletics
Gull Lake High School athletes compete in the Southwest Michigan Athletic Conference (SMAC). The athletes earned All Sports Champion recognition several years running.

Fall Sports: football, boys soccer, girls volleyball, sideline cheer, girls golf, boys tennis, cross country

Winter Sports: boys basketball, girls basketball, boys bowling, girls bowling, girls competitive cheer, wrestling

Spring Sports: boys baseball, girls softball, track, girls soccer, boys golf, girls tennis.

Notable alumni
Jason Curtis Newsted, Class of '83, is a bassist known best for his work with Metallica.
Caleb Porter, class of 1993, who was a collegiate and professional soccer player before becoming a United States National Team and MLS coach 
Xavier Prather, class of 2012, first African-American winner of Big Brother

References

External links

Gull Lake Community Schools website

Public high schools in Michigan
Schools in Kalamazoo County, Michigan